Ever Since Paradise is a 1946 comedy play by the British writer J.B. Priestley.

It premiered at the Lyceum Theatre in Sheffield in August 1946. The following June it transferred to the New Theatre in London's West End where it ran for 165 performances. The cast included Jane Carr, Joy Shelton, Roger Livesey, Ursula Jeans and Dennis Arundell.

References

Bibliography
 Wearing, J.P. The London Stage 1940-1949: A Calendar of Productions, Performers, and Personnel.  Rowman & Littlefield, 2014.

1946 plays
Plays by J. B. Priestley
Comedy plays
West End plays